Lalawmpuia Pachuau is an Indian football who plays for South United in the I-League 2nd Division as a forward. Lalawmpuia Pachuau is a product of the Tata Football Academy in Jamshedpur.

Career

After spending years at Tata Football Academy Puia signed a professional contract with Mohun Bagan.

South United
Lalawmpuia signed for South United for 2013 I-League 2nd Division season.

External links
 
 goal.com

Indian footballers
1989 births
Living people
I-League players
Footballers from Mizoram
Association football forwards